The Japanese Garden is a  public Japanese garden in Los Angeles, located in the Lake Balboa district in the central San Fernando Valley, adjacent to the  Van Nuys and Encino neighborhoods. It is specifically on the grounds of the Tillman Water Reclamation Plant adjacent to Woodley Park, in the Sepulveda Basin Recreation Area.

The garden's Japanese name is Suihō-en (水芳園) meaning "garden of water and fragrance." The idea of having a Japanese Garden adjacent to a water reclamation plant was conceived by Donald C. Tillman. The garden's purpose was to demonstrate a positive use of reclaimed water,  in what is usually considered a delicate environment, a Japanese garden. The ponds and irrigation use reclaimed water from the adjacent water reclamation plant.

Design
The gardens were designed by Dr. Koichi Kawana, and created from 1980 to 1983. Their formal dedication was in June 1984. The Japanese Garden has been ranked 10th out of 300 public Japanese gardens in the United States by the Journal of Japanese Gardening.

As one first enters The Japanese Garden, one walks through a dry Zen meditation garden (Karesansui) containing a large grass-covered mound, representing Tortoise Island, a symbol of longevity,  and a Three Buddhas (Trikaya) arrangement of stones. Next comes an expansive chisen, or "wet strolling" garden with waterfalls, lakes, trees, and stone lanterns. At path's end is the Shoin Building with an authentic 4½ tatami (7 m2) tea house and adjacent tea garden.

Events and in media
The garden is a popular spot for visiting and planned events.  It can be rented for wedding ceremonies and Hollywood film/video projects, such as Star Trek: The Next Generation where it stood for various planets and Starfleet locations on Earth, including the Starfleet Academy. The Shoin building was also used as the spa in the 2003 film Bruce Almighty.

See also

References

External links 
 
 The Japanese Garden official website
 The Japanese Garden photo gallery
 Tillman Water Reclamation Plant website

Japanese gardens in California
Parks in Los Angeles
Parks in the San Fernando Valley
Lake Balboa, Los Angeles
Van Nuys, Los Angeles
Cultural infrastructure completed in 1984
1984 establishments in California